"Mountain Music" is a song written by Randy Owen, and recorded by American country music band Alabama.  It was released in January 1982 as the lead-off single and title track to Alabama's album Mountain Music.

About the song
"Mountain Music" — a song melding the Southern rock and bluegrass genres — has variously been described by country music writers as "a modern country classic" and a song that "practically defined what country groups have strived to accomplish."

According to Randy Owen's book, Born Country, "Mountain Music" took three years to write. He wanted to put his childhood experiences into a song.

The song references chert rocks, which according to the band is one song lyric that is commonly misheard.

Vocals
"Mountain Music" is one of the only Alabama songs where solo vocals can prominently be heard from band members Teddy Gentry and Jeff Cook (in the song's third verse, where lead singer Owen trades off lead vocals with his bandmates).

Brad Paisley's 2011 single "Old Alabama" incorporates the bridge from "Mountain Music", again sung by Owen, Gentry and Cook.

Single and album edits
The single edit to "Mountain Music," released for retail sale and radio airplay, excises the following from the album version:

 The introduction, wherein an old mountain philosopher speaks about someday climbing a mountain. This Walter Brennan impression was done by Bob Martin, a guitar handler and roadie with the band. It's in reference to a song Brennan recorded called "Old Rivers", which repeats the line, "... one of these days I'm gonna climb that mountain..." A harmonica solo can also be heard at the very beginning.
 A series of guitar riffs slowly builds in tempo from slow to very fast. This is nestled between the third refrain and the fast-tempoed fiddle-heavy musical bridge before the finalé.

Charts
Released in January 1982, "Mountain Music" became Alabama's sixth No. 1 song on Billboard magazines Hot Country Singles chart - the same week the Academy of Country Music named the group the Top Vocal Group and Entertainer of the Year.

To date, "Mountain Music" remains one of the group's most popular songs.

Weekly charts

Year-end charts

Certifications

ReferencesWorks cited'
Morris, Edward, "Alabama," Contemporary Books Inc., Chicago, 1985

1982 singles
1982 songs
Alabama (American band) songs
Song recordings produced by Harold Shedd
RCA Records singles
Songs written by Randy Owen
Songs about music